Abu al-Mu'in al-Nasafi (c.1027-c.1115 A.D.), was considered to be the most important Central Asian Hanafi theologian in the Maturidite school of Sunni Islam after Imam Abu Mansur al-Maturidi, provided a fairly detailed account of al-Maturidi Central Asian predecessors.

Name 
His name was Abu al-Ma'in Maymun b. Muhammad b. Muhammad b. Mu'tamad b. Muhammad Ibn Mak-hul b. al-Fadhl al-Nasafi al-Mak-huli.

Birth 
He was born in Nasaf (present Karshi) around 438 A.H. (1046 A.D.) and died in the same city in 508 A.H. (1115 A.D.). It was said that his birth was in 418 A.H. (1027 A.D.) according to Khair al-Din al-Zarkali and Umar Rizo Kahhol, while Qutluwbugha says it was in 438 A.H. (1046 A.D.), based on the age of his death being seventy years in the year of 508 A.H. (1115 A.D.).

Life 
Classical sources give no information about his life, but he lived in an age in which Muslim theology was reaching its peak, and he contributed to this development.

He was born in an educated family. His ancestors were respected by society as great scholars of "fiqh" science. His great-grandfather, Makhul Nasafi, was a disciple of Imam al-Maturidi, and his grandfather, Mu’tamid ibn Makhul Nasafi, was famous as a theologian, Hanafi jurist (Faqih), and mystic (Sufi) who was reported to have written a number of works. He received his primary education from his father and grandfather.

Kalam 

Abu al-Mu'in al-Nasafi was one of the prominent representatives of "kalam", the science of aqeedah, and played an important role in the wide dissemination of the teachings of Maturidiyya, founded by Abu Mansur al-Maturidi.

Students 

Some of his popular students are:
 Najm al-Din 'Umar al-Nasafi (d. 537/1142), the author of al-'Aqa'id al-Nasafiyyah.
 'Ala' al-Din Samarqandi (d. 539/1144), the author of Tuhfat al-Fuqaha'.
 'Ala' al-Din al-Kasani (d. 578/1191), the author of Bada'i' al-Sana'i'.
 Sadr al-A'imma Abu al-Ma'ali Ahmad b. Muhammad b. Muhammad b. al-Husain al-Bazdawi (d. 542/1147).

Sometimes it's assumed that Abu al-Thana' al-Lamishi was a student of him, though this is not known for sure.

Books 
He wrote many works aimed at clarifying misconceptions about Islam, fighting religious fanaticism. Some of his popular and widely accepted works are as follows:

 Tabsirat al-Adillah (Instructing the Evidences); is considered as the second major work in the Maturidi curriculum, after Imam al-Maturidi's Kitab al-Tawhid.
 Al-Tamhid li-Qawa'id al-Tawhid (Introduction to the Principles of Monotheism); is a summary of Tabsirat al-Adilla (Instructing the Evidences).
 Bahr al-Kalam fi 'Ilm al-Tawhid (Ocean of Discussions on the Science of Monotheism); is one of the main sources of "kalam" science in Maturidism.

Death 
It is widely accepted that he died in 508 A.H. (1114 or 1115 A.D.).

His mausoleum, located in the village of Kovchin in Karshi district, is one of the ancient pilgrimage places.

President Shavkat Mirziyoyev, during his visit to Kashkadarya region on 24–25 February 2017, gave recommendations on improvement of his mausoleum, creation of necessary conditions for visitors, organization of a library and translation of his works.

See also 
 Abu Hanifa
 Al-Hakim al-Samarqandi
 Abu al-Yusr al-Bazdawi
 Abu Ishaq al-Saffar al-Bukhari
 Nur al-Din al-Sabuni
 List of Hanafis
 List of Ash'aris and Maturidis
 List of Muslim theologians

References

External links
 President Shavkat Mirziyoyev visits mausoleum of Abu Mouin Nasafi

Hanafis
Maturidis
12th-century Muslim theologians
Transoxanian Islamic scholars
Mujaddid
Sunni imams
Sunni fiqh scholars
Sunni Muslim scholars of Islam
Uzbekistani Muslims
12th-century Muslim scholars of Islam
11th-century Muslim scholars of Islam
1027 births
1046 births
1114 deaths
1115 deaths
11th-century Muslim theologians